A broadcast designer is a person involved with creating graphic designs and electronic media incorporated in television productions that are used by character generator (CG) operators. A broadcast designer may have a degree in digital media (or a similar degree), or is self-taught in the software needed to create such content. CG stands for computer graphics, most broadcast designers studied either graphic design or visual communicationthis term is used for those designing motion graphics also for film, industrials, commercials, and the web.

A large portion of broadcast design is known as "branding" for television channels and programs. The job of the designer is to create a look and feel for a specific idea or subject. Often, television stations will wish to re-invent their style or "on air look"this is where the broadcast designer's skills are called upon to design lower third digital on-screen graphics (DOG or BUG) and motion graphics.

Another industry which is reliant on a designer's skill is the television commercial advertising market. Most often, a client will hire an advertising agency which will then hire a group of designers to produce a commercial for their product. The process usually begins with a concept or an idea which the client has or the agency comes up with. It is then further explored in design boards which go up for approval by the client before the process of making it actually begins.

See also
 Acknowledgment (creative arts)
 Billing (filmmaking)
 Character generator
 Closing credits
 Credit (creative arts)
 Digital on-screen graphic (BUG)
 Graphics coordinator
 Lower third
 Production logo
 Score bug
 Title sequence
 WGA screenwriting credit system
 Television news screen layout

Broadcasting occupations
Mass media occupations
Television terminology